Arcyophora is a genus of moths of the family Erebidae. The genus was erected by Achille Guenée in 1852.

Species
Arcyophora amydropoliata Hacker, 2013 Yemen
Arcyophora bothrophora Hampson, 1907 Sri Lanka
Arcyophora dentula (Lederer, 1869) Iran, India
Arcyophora dives (Butler, 1898) Kenya
Arcyophora elegantula Grünberg, 1910 South Africa, Zaire (Katanga)
Arcyophora endoglauca (Hampson, 1910) Tanzania, Zambia, Zaire (Katanga)
Arcyophora icterica (Swinoe, 1886) southern India
Arcyophora ledereri (Wallengren, 1863) Namibia, South Africa
Arcyophora longivalvis Guenée, 1852 Arabia, Yemen, Sudan, Ethiopia, Somalia, Eritrea, Tanzania, Mozambique, Malawi, Botswana, Zambia, Zimbabwe, South Africa, Namibia, Cameroon, Zaire, Guinea
Arcyophora nudipes Wallengren, 1856 South Africa
Arcyophora patricula (Hampson, 1902) Zimbabwe, Zambia, Mozambique, Malawi, Tanzania, Kenya, Ethiopia, Eritrea, Sudan, Saudi Arabia, Nigeria, Zaire, Senegal, Cameroon
Arcyophora polla (Schaus, 1893) Sierra Leone
Arcyophora stalii (Wallengren, 1863) Botswana
Arcyophora sylvatica Büttiker, 1962 Cambodia
Arcyophora trigramma (Hampson, 1912) north-western India
Arcyophora zanderi Felder & Rogenhofer, 1875 Ethiopia, Zaire, Guinea, Namibia

References

Calpinae